Gunilla Marxer-Kranz (born 28 May 1972) is a politician from Liechtenstein and the incumbent vice-president of the Landtag of Liechtenstein, having assumed the post in 2017.

She studied law and entered the Liechtenstein Bar. Prior to her entry to politics, she was employed part-time as a lawyer at the Liechtenstein Chamber of Commerce. She spent half a year in Colombia, where she worked at a nursery and at psychiatric wards. Her Landstag biography lists her occupations as "lawyer, housewife".

She lives in the village of Nendeln. In the 2017 general election, she was a candidate for the Patriotic Union at the Unterland electoral district. Here, she received 1,635 preferential votes, amounting to 29.5% of the electoral body, and was elected as the third-place member of the parliament of the party from the district. She got the highest percentage of votes in the Ruggell municipality, where her share stood at 36.3% with 373 votes. On 30 March 2017, she was elected as the new vice-president of the Landtag with the near-unanimous support of 24 members of the parliament.

She is married to Philipp Marxer and has two sons.

References 

1972 births
Liechtenstein women in politics
Members of the Landtag of Liechtenstein
Patriotic Union (Liechtenstein) politicians
21st-century women politicians
Living people
20th-century Liechtenstein women
21st-century Liechtenstein politicians
21st-century Liechtenstein women